Magoula (Greek: Μαγούλα) may refer to several places in Greece:

Magoula, Attica, a western suburb of Athens north of Elefsina
Magoula, a subdivision of Sparta in Laconia 
Magoula, Larissa, a village and a community in Elassona
Skete of Magoula, a former Greek Orthodox Christian skete near Philotheou Monastery, Mount Athos